"It's Alright, I Feel It!" is a song by Nuyorican Soul, a project by the house-garage production and remix team of "Little" Louie Vega and Kenny "Dope" Gonzalez. It features American singer Jocelyn Brown, who also co-wrote it, and was released in 1997 as the third single from their debut album, Nuyorican Soul (1997). The song peaked at number 34 on the UK Singles Chart and number one on the UK Dance Singles Chart, while in the US, it reached number three on the Billboard Hot Dance Club Play chart. A music video was also produced to promote the single.

Critical reception
Larry Flick from Billboard felt that the third single from Nuyorican Soul's "groundbreaking" debut disc "showcases the vocals of club legend Jocelyn Brown, who steamrolls through this sweet funk/disco number with her typical blend of no-non-sense aggression and soulful flair. The hook is immediate, and the live instrumentation provides a wonderful warmth that is missing from most other dance records right now. Turntable artists who need a more dubby vibe will be pleased to discover a wealth of remixes that are wisely trend-conscious. None of these versions, however can hold a candle to the original production by "Little" Louie Vega and Kenny "Dope" Gonzalez, which is where musically savvy listeners should instantly gravitate." 

British magazine Music Week rated it four out of five, stating that "this frantic groover, with its slinky, funky soul reinforced by Jocelyn Brown's soaring vocals, sounds like one of the first sounds of the summer. Top notch." Daisy & Havoc from the RM Dance Update named it House Tune of the Week and gave it five out of five, adding, "If you failed to get your hands on the whistle-and-you-missed-it Nuyorican Soul album, perhaps the biggest loss you suffered was this tremendous track sung by the inimitable Jocelyn Brown. Its a beautiful downtempo piece of unashamed rejoicing in the power of music and indeed the voices of Brown and her marvellous backing singers. Packed full of cliches, the "power of the groove", a great breakdown and such old-fashioned devices as never-ending tinkling ivories, it will bring tears to your eyes - especially if your faith in music, the power of the groove and so on, is in any doubt."

Impact and legacy
Singaporean DJ, co-founder and managing director of Zouk Kuala Lumpur DJ Cher included the track in his top 10 in 1997, saying, "It's going to be a classic, that's for sure. It's the kind of song that doesn't come that often and when you hear it you know it'll be an instant hit."

Track listing
 12", UK (1997)
A1. "It's Alright, I Feel It!" (M.A.W. 12" Mix) – 9:47
A2. "It's Alright, I Feel It!" (Rascal Beats) – 3:49
B. "It's Alright, I Feel It!" (Roni Size Remix) – 13:14

 CD single, US (1997)
"It's Alright, I Feel It!" (Edit) – 4:05
"It's Alright, I Feel It!" (M.A.W. Remix) – 9:49
"It's Alright, I Feel It!" (Live From Da Darkside Of Da Moon) – 11:32
"It's Alright, I Feel It!" (Roni Size Remix) – 13:16
"It's Alright, I Feel It!" (Mood II Swing Remix) – 8:11

 CD maxi, UK (1997)
"It's Alright, I Feel It!" (Radio Edit) – 3:20
"It's Alright, I Feel It!" (M.A.W. Remix) – 9:48
"It's Alright, I Feel It!" (Live From Da Darkside Of Da Moon) – 11:36

Charts

Weekly charts

Year-end charts

References

1997 singles
1997 songs
American house music songs
Electronic songs
House music songs
Jocelyn Brown songs
Talkin' Loud singles